is a Japanese term of Zen Buddhist origin which means "enduring the seemingly unbearable with patience and dignity". The term is generally translated as "perseverance", "patience", or "tolerance". A related term, a compound with tsuyoi (strong), means "suffering the unbearable" or having a high capacity for a kind of stoic endurance.

Gaman is variously described as a "virtue", an "ethos", a "trait", etc. It means to do one's best in distressed times and to maintain self-control and discipline.

Gaman is a teaching of Zen Buddhism.

Analysis
Gaman has been attributed to the Japanese-Americans and others held in United States' internment camps during World War II and to those affected by the 2011 Tōhoku earthquake and tsunami in northern Japan. In the internment camps, gaman was misperceived by the non-Japanese as introverted behavior or as a lack of assertiveness or initiative rather than as a demonstration of strength in the face of difficulty or suffering. Gaman and the related term yase-gaman are, in Japanese society, closely related to complying with conformity, and silent heroism, which seems to be hidden pride for compensation for sacrifice and be satisfied to pay reciprocal service in advance, or to be seen themselves as victims by folks. Gaman toward authority, 'unquestioning obedience' or 'blind obedience' is supposed to be unfit to a healthy democracy.

Mentality of Gaman seems to be derived from the strong conviction of Japanese way 
of fatalism, which was reinforced by Buddhism mujo, impermanence, nihilism,tradition of self destruction ,the collective nature of its society, and the forced attitudes of resignation  and submission under the Edo feudal period. Those world-views were depicted in The Tale of the Heike, the works of Yoshida Kenkou, Kamo no Chomei.The sequence of events of Japanese fatalism seems to be explained as dormant,ceaseless accumulation of self-righteousness and sudden manifestation of aggression if suppression(Gaman) fails.                    

After the 2011 Tōhoku earthquake and tsunami, the resilience, civility, lack of looting and ability of the Japanese to help each other was widely attributed to the gaman spirit. The 50–70 heroes who remained at the damaged and radiation-emitting Fukushima Daiichi Nuclear Power Plant despite the severe danger demonstrated what was regarded as gaman as well.

Gaman is also used in psychoanalytic studies and to describe the attitudes of the Japanese. It is often taught to youth and largely used by older Japanese generations. Showing gaman is seen as a sign of maturity and strength. Keeping private affairs, problems and complaints silent demonstrates strength and politeness as others have seemingly larger problems as well. If a person with gaman were to receive help from someone else, they would be compliant; not asking for any additional help and voicing no concerns.

See also
 Ganbaru
 Hirohito surrender broadcast
 Sisu
 Stiff upper lip
 Shikata ga nai
 Yamato-damashii
 Honne and tatemae

Notes

Bibliography

Further reading

External links
The Art of Gaman: Arts and Crafts from the Japanese American Internment Camps, 1942-1946 at Smithsonian Institution
 The Art of Gaman at the University Art Museum, Tokyo University of the Arts
尊厳の藝術展 (The Art of Gaman) at NHK.or.jp (in Japanese; archived)
Gaman at American Chamber of Commerce in Japan (ACCJ) (archived)

Japanese words and phrases
Japanese culture
Zen Buddhist philosophical concepts
Words and phrases describing personality